One Lagos Night is a 2021 Nigerian crime comedy film set in Lagos. It was directed and produced by Ekene Som Mekwunye.

Cast

 Eniola Badmus
 Ali Nuhu
 Frank Donga
 Ikponmwosa Gold
 Ogbolor
 Chris Okagbue
 Genoveva Umeh
 Ani Iyoho
 Diran Aderinto
 Gbubemi Ejeye
 Lynda Ada Dozie
 Akorede Ajayi
 Serge Noujaim
 Judith Ijeoma Agazi
 Yetunde Taiwo,
 Alex Ayalogu
 Chima Temple Adighije.

Release and reception
It first screened at the Nollywood Week, Paris on 10 May 2021 where it was one of the 9 officially selected feature films to screen at the international film festival where it was allotted the closing film slot at the film festival. After that, Netflix acquired the exclusive rights to the film where in premiered on the platform on the 29 May 2021. It received great reviews from critics like Filmrats.

References

External links
 

2021 films
English-language Nigerian films
Nigerian crime comedy films
Films set in Lagos
2020s English-language films